Million Dollar Mermaid (also known as The One Piece Bathing Suit in the UK) is a 1952 American biographical drama film about the life of Australian swimming star Annette Kellerman. It was directed by Mervyn LeRoy and produced by Arthur Hornblow Jr. from a screenplay by Everett Freeman. The music score was by Adolph Deutsch, the cinematography by George Folsey and the choreography by Busby Berkeley.

George Folsey received a 1953 Oscar nomination for Best Cinematography, Color.

The film stars Esther Williams, Victor Mature, and Walter Pidgeon, with David Brian and Donna Corcoran.

Plot
In the late 19th century, a polio-stricken Australian girl, Annette Kellerman (Esther Williams), swims as a means to improve her health. Her father, Frederick (Walter Pidgeon), who owns a music conservatory, accepts a teaching position in England.

Aboard ship, Annette encounters the American promoter James Sullivan (Victor Mature) and his associate Doc Cronnol (Jesse White), who are taking a boxing kangaroo called Sydney with them to London.

The teaching position falls through, and Jimmy suggests promoting Annette in a six-mile swim to Greenwich. She volunteers to make it 26 miles instead. Word spreads of the swim, and Annette's feat makes news.

Jimmy suggests they can make a fortune by going to New York and appearing in a water ballet at the Hippodrome. Manager Alfred Harper (David Brian) does not offer them a job in the show, so Annette goes to Boston for a highly publicized swim and gets in hot water for wearing a one-piece suit too revealing for its time.

She and Jimmy have a misunderstanding and part ways. Harper has a change of heart and makes Annette headliner of his New York show. After the death of her father, she travels to Montauk at the behest of Doc to try to dissuade Jimmy from flying in an air race with a $50,000 prize. It does not go well.

As time passes, Harper falls in love with Annette while she travels to Hollywood to make a film. Jimmy and Doc turn up, this time promoting a dog called Rin Tin Tin that they hope to star in the movies.

A water tank bursts during the making of Annette's film, causing her serious injury, spinal hematoma. With her future in doubt, Harper steps aside when he sees for himself how much Annette and Jimmy are in love.

Cast 
 Esther Williams as Annette Kellerman 
 Victor Mature as James Sullivan 
 Walter Pidgeon as Frederick Kellerman 
 David Brian as Alfred Harper 
 Donna Corcoran as Annette Kellerman at age 10 
 Jesse White as Doc Cronnol 
 Maria Tallchief as Anna Pavlova
 Howard Freeman as Aldrich, Lecture Bureau 
 Charles Watts as Policeman on Revere Beach 
 Wilton Graff as Garvey the Producer 
 Frank Ferguson as Boston Prosecutor 
 James Bell as Boston Judge 
 James Flavin as Train conductor 
 Willis Bouchey as Movie director
 Gordon Richards as Casey

Production
In 1947, it was reported that Esther Williams wanted MGM to buy the rights to Annette Kellerman's life story as a vehicle for her. Virginia Mayo also expressed interest in playing Kellerman on screen.

Kellerman was unhappy that MGM had greatly changed her film Neptune's Daughter when they remade it as an Esther Williams vehicle. (She felt it should have been a fantasy like The Red Shoes.) "I cried so about it that at the time I never would have agreed to let them do my life story."

However, Kellerman changed her mind when she met Williams and liked her. "I realised she really wanted to make my life story", said Kellerman. "I never would have thought of her for the part – she's much too pretty."

Williams brought Kellerman to meet MGM studio executives and pitched the project to them. She says she did not hear anything back from the studio for a number of months until she read an article in the trade papers that the film was being made. In February 1951, it was announced MGM had signed a deal with Kellerman to make a film based on her life. It was originally called The One Piece Suit. Arthur Hornblow Jr. was assigned to produce.

"Miss Kellerman is a charming woman", said Williams. "And still has very good health and figure. She was a famous stage personality and made several sensational movies for her time. I believe her life will provide a fine subject for me."

"I can still hold my own with Esther from the neck down", Kellerman said. "From the neck up, I think she is much too glamorous for the role. I think, really, she's too beautiful. I'd rather have seen Metro-Goldwyn-Mayer cast either a new actress, perhaps an Australian girl, in the part. Don't think I'm complaining, though. She's a lovely girl, and I'm very fond of her. I just feel that she's such a
'name' that people will be a little inclined to associate the picture with her rather than me."

Kellerman liked Hornblow. "He is the man who finds life and drama in simple things, and that really is what my story is. In the two years before we started work...  I went through half a dozen scripts, all of which I rejected because they just wanted to make it a glamorous, typically Hollywood, romance story. I thought they were silly and undignified." Before filming, Kellerman says she wrote the outline of the script which MGM was going to use. "I insisted on the right to edit the script, because I didn't want Hollywood making a mess of my story. My life has been a beautiful one, and I didn't want them doing anything that would make it look cheap in any way."

Casting
Louis Calhern was going to play Kellerman's father, but, eventually, the role went to Walter Pidgeon. Pidgeon's casting delighted Kellerman who said she "felt like kissing him" when she saw the first rushes of him on screen.

Kellerman hoped that Glenn Ford would play her husband, Jimmy Sullivan. Kellerman said Ford was "the nearest thing I can think of to my dear husband-not too glamorous, and he implies the strength and understanding necessary for the part. We [my husband and I] have been married 39 years, and are still just as thrilled with each other as ever we were. Our film is no love story with misunderstandings and scandals. It is just a good clean story; that's the way we've lived our lives."

The part of Sullivan went to Victor Mature, who had recently had a big hit in Samson and Delilah. Kellerman later said she thought the film's depiction of Sullivan was "the antithesis" of the character in real life (she called him a "quiet, unassuming" man who " never did anything cheap"). She said friends would tease the real Sullivan about Mature's casting, greeting him with "Here comes Samson."

Filming
Esther Williams broke her neck upon impact while performing the film's signature high dive. She wrote in her memoir that she was already disoriented atop the platform after seven broken eardrums as the wages of her years working underwater. When she dove, she knew that the headdress of her costume was too heavy and that she was in trouble. She heard her neck pop when she hit the water. When she reached the surface, she could kick her legs, but her upper body was paralyzed and she had to be helped out of the pool. An x-ray revealed she had broken three vertebrae. Williams writes, "I'd come as close to snapping my spinal cord and becoming a paraplegic as you could without actually succeeding.”

The title
Million Dollar Mermaid not only became Esther Williams' nickname around Hollywood, but it became the title of her autobiography (New York: Simon and Schuster, 1999), co-written with Digby Diehl. Williams has often called this her favorite film.

Release
The film opened at Radio City Music Hall in New York City on December 4, 1952. In its fourth week, the week ended December 31, 1952, it set a record gross for a film in one theatre with a gross of $184,000.

According to MGM records, the film earned $2,851,000 in the US and Canada and $2,096,000 elsewhere resulting in a profit of $243,000.

Proposed sequel
After the film was released, it was reported Mervyn Le Roy met with Kellerman to discuss a sequel, that would cover Kellerman's career as a film star and her wartime work for the Red Cross. However, no sequel was made.

Home media
The VHS format was first released by MGM in 1989.

On October 6, 2009, Turner Classic Movies, via Turner Entertainment, released Million Dollar Mermaid on DVD as part of the Esther Williams Spotlight Collection, Volume 2. The 6 disc set was a follow up to the company's Esther Williams Spotlight Collection, Volume 1, and contains digitally remastered versions of several of Williams's films including Thrill of a Romance (1945), Fiesta (1947), This Time for Keeps (1947), Pagan Love Song (1950) and Easy to Love (1953).

The film's individual DVD format was released on June 26, 2018 by Warner Archive Collection, who also released the Blu-ray on July 28, 2020.

Accolades
The film is recognized by American Film Institute in these lists:
 2006: AFI's 100 Years...100 Cheers – Nominated

References

External links 

 
 
 
 

1952 films
1950s musical drama films
American biographical films
American musical drama films
Films directed by Mervyn LeRoy
Films scored by Adolph Deutsch
Films set in the 1900s
Films set in the 1910s
Films set in London
Films set in New York City
Metro-Goldwyn-Mayer films
Swimming films
1950s English-language films
1950s American films